Tina L. Podlodowski (born 1960) is an American businesswoman and politician who served as the Chair of the Washington State Democratic Party for three terms. A member of the Democratic Party, she previously served as a member of the Seattle City Council and unsuccessfully ran for Secretary of State of Washington in 2016.

Career
Podlodowski graduated with a bachelor's degree in Computer Science from the University of Hartford. After graduation she worked with a number of technology start-ups, finally coming to Microsoft in 1984, where she managed groups in product marketing, domestic and international sales, and eventually Microsoft's global training department. After leaving Microsoft in 1993, she was one of the principal investors in the purchase and renovation of Seattle's historic Paramount Theatre. She was elected to the Seattle City Council in 1995. She served on the council for one term, chairing the Public Safety, Health and Technology Committee. In 2004, she was named the executive director of the Lifelong AIDS Alliance, a position that she held until 2007. She also worked with Big Brothers Big Sisters of Puget Sound and as a practice manager for Porter Novelli. In 2014, she advised Ed Murray, the Mayor of Seattle, on issues of policing.

In January 2016, Podlodowski announced that she would run against Kim Wyman, the incumbent Secretary of State of Washington, in the 2016 election. Wyman defeated Podlodowski with 55% of the vote.

In January 2017, Podlodowski was elected to be the chair of the Washington State Democratic Party, defeating incumbent Jaxon Ravens. She did not run for another term in January 2023.

Personal life

Podlodowski is openly gay. She is married and has three children.

References

External links

1960 births
21st-century American women politicians
American LGBT city council members
Candidates in the 2016 United States elections
Lesbian politicians
LGBT people from Washington (state)
Living people
Place of birth missing (living people)
Seattle City Council members
State political party chairs of Washington (state)
University of Hartford alumni
Washington (state) Democrats
Women city councillors in Washington (state)